Something for the Blunted is the first extended play released from hip hop artist Cypress Hill. It has seven tracks from the Cypress Hill album.

Track listing
Tracklist:

 "Hand on the Pump" (Muggs' Blunted Mix) (The Funky Cypress Hill Shit Part 2) (4:02)
 "Hand on the Glock" (3:30)
 "The Phuncky Feel One" (Extended) (5:02)
 "Real Estate" (3:51)
 "Light Another" (3:21)
 "Psychobetabuckdown" (3:03)
 "Something for the Blunted" (1:16)

References

External links

1992 debut EPs
Cypress Hill albums